Gaëtan Paquiez (born 15 February 1994) is a French professional footballer who plays as a midfielder for Ligue 2 club Nîmes.

References

Living people
1994 births
Association football midfielders
French footballers
Ligue 1 players
Ligue 2 players
Nîmes Olympique players